Edward J.C. Kewen (November 2, 1825 – 1879) was a California politician and the first Attorney General of California. He was Superintendent of the Los Angeles City schools in 1858 and Los Angeles County District Attorney from 1859 to 1861. He also served in both the Assembly and Senate of the California State Legislature.

Kewen was originally from Columbus, Mississippi. At the age of thirteen, he matriculated at Wesleyan University in Middletown, Connecticut. He had to return home, however, after his third year of study. Unable to complete his undergraduate education, he became an attorney by reading law in his native Columbus. Subsequently, he removed to St. Louis, Missouri—for the purpose of practicing law—before relocating to California.

Kewen is an honoree of the Los Angeles County Bar Association's Criminal Justice Wall of Fame (1850–2000): "In Honor of Los Angeles Judges and Lawyers Whose Outstanding Conduct and Professionalism Made Significant Contributions to the Criminal Justice System During Their Lifetimes."

References

External links
Brief biography with picture

1825 births
1879 deaths
Wesleyan University alumni
California Attorneys General
District attorneys in California
19th-century American politicians
American lawyers admitted to the practice of law by reading law